HS Engineering is an Austrian motor racing team. It was founded in 2003 by Michael Hascic. HS Engineering always focussed on regional and continental championships in Germany and Europe. Until 2011, the team was known as HS Technik.

The team gained its first major success in the second year after its foundation, when Bastian Kolmsee won the 2004 German Formula 3 championship. After another win of the same championship in 2010 with Tom Dillmann, the team stepped away from single seaters from 2014 until 2021; where they fielded two Dallara T12's at select BOSS GP rounds in 2021, with the cars prepared by former Auto GP team Zele Racing.

Former series results

German Formula 3

† – Shared results with other teams
‡ – Guest driver, ineligible for points.

Formula 3 Euro Series

‡ – As Day was a guest driver, he was ineligible for points.

ADAC Formel Masters

References

German Formula 3 teams
Formula 3 Euro Series teams
Formula BMW teams